Northern Acres is a suburb of Johannesburg, South Africa. It is located in Region 3.

References 

Johannesburg Region E